Ricardo Cadena Martínez (born 23 October 1969) is a Mexican former professional footballer who played as a defender during his career. He was a member of the Mexico national team competing at the 1992 Summer Olympics in Barcelona, Spain. He earned one cap for the national A-side, making his only appearance on June 29, 1993.

Managerial statistics
Statistics accurate as of match played 9 October 2022

References
sports-reference
FIFA

External links

1969 births
Living people
1993 CONCACAF Gold Cup players
Association football defenders
C.D. Guadalajara managers
C.D. Guadalajara non-playing staff
Chiapas F.C. footballers
Club León footballers
Club Necaxa non-playing staff
Club Tijuana footballers
Dorados de Sinaloa footballers
Footballers at the 1992 Summer Olympics
Footballers from Guadalajara, Jalisco
La Piedad footballers
Lagartos de Tabasco footballers
Liga MX players
Mexican football managers
Mexican footballers
Mexico international footballers
Olympic footballers of Mexico
Medalists at the 1991 Pan American Games
Pan American Games silver medalists for Mexico
Pan American Games medalists in football
Footballers at the 1991 Pan American Games